Carmen Campos Costa (born 10 July 1995) is a Spanish female handballer for Jeanne d'Arc Dijon Handball and the Spanish national team.

She won the gold medal at the 2018 Mediterranean Games.

References

External links

Living people
1995 births
Spanish female handball players
Sportspeople from Madrid
Competitors at the 2018 Mediterranean Games
Competitors at the 2022 Mediterranean Games
Mediterranean Games gold medalists for Spain
Mediterranean Games medalists in handball
Expatriate handball players
Spanish expatriate sportspeople in France
Handball players from the Community of Madrid